Hunt's Snack Pack is a pudding snack manufactured since 1977 by ConAgra Foods.

About
Snack Packs were introduced in 1968 in single-serve aluminum/metal cans, before switching to plastic cups in 1984 and clear plastic cups in 1990. They are marketed as healthy treats for children. In the 1970s Snack Pack was sold in Australia via the Foster Clark company with the television slogan "if it wasn't for a Snack Pack, a kid'd starve".

In popular culture
Snack Pack appears in the movie Billy Madison as it is the title character's favorite dessert. He is disappointed that Juanita packed him a banana instead of a Snack Pack in his lunch, so he attempts to take one from a schoolboy in exchange for his banana during lunch time, but fails. Billy eventually gets a whole pack of Snack Pack as a present from Miss Vaughn when celebrating passing Third Grade.

In episode 16 of season 3 That '70s Show, Kitty Forman gives Fez and Hyde a pair of Snack Packs. However, instead of the period-accurate aluminum containers of the 1970s the Snack Packs are in the modern-day clear plastic current containers.

In Episode 14 of Season 2 of How I Met Your Mother, Marshal demands a Snack Pack from a child in Lily's kindergarten class after spraying his pants with juice for blackmailing him with the Super Bowl results.

In Episode 8 of Season 1 of the Netflix series Stranger Things (Chapter 8: The Upside Down), Dustin and Lucas raid the school cafeteria for a hidden stash of chocolate Snack Packs.

Flavors

Apple Pie a la Mode
Banana
Banana Cream Pie
Blueberry Muffin
Butterscotch
Caramel Cream
Chocolate
Chocolate Caramel
Chocolate Cookie Dough
Chocolate Cupcake
Chocolate Daredevil
Chocolate Fudge
Chocolate Marshmallow (Discontinued)
Chocolate Mud Pie
Chocolate Vanilla
Cinnamon Roll
Cinnamon Twist Churro
Dulce De Leche
Frosted Sugar cookie
Ice Cream Sandwich
Lemon
Lemon Meringue Pie
Milk Chocolate
Cherry Gels
S'mores
Strawberry Gels
Strawberry Orange Gels
Tapioca
Vanilla
Triple-Brownie
Chocolate Fudge and Swirl
Black Cherry Gels
Cherry/Lemon Lime Gels
Orange Gels

Many of the above flavors are available in *no sugar added* and *fat free* varieties. Also, Lemon and Lemon Meringue Pie contain no milk products.

References

External links
 Official site

Brand name snack foods
Conagra Brands brands
Products introduced in 1968
Food for children